John Chaplin is a former track and field coach at Washington State University in Pullman. He was head coach of the 2000 U.S. men’s Olympic Track & Field team.

References

American male sprinters
Washington State Cougars men's track and field athletes
Washington State Cougars track and field coaches
College men's track and field athletes in the United States
Washington State University alumni
Washington State University faculty
Living people
Year of birth missing (living people)